The 2018 Junior Pan American Rhythmic Gymnastics Championships was held in Medellín, Colombia, May 2–6, 2018.

Medal summary

References

2018 in gymnastics
Pan American Gymnastics Championships
International gymnastics competitions hosted by Colombia